Adolph Schayes (May 19, 1928 – December 10, 2015) was an American professional basketball player and coach in the National Basketball Association (NBA). A top scorer and rebounder, he was a 12-time NBA All-Star and a 12-time All-NBA selection. Schayes won an NBA championship with the Syracuse Nationals in 1955. He was named one of the 50 Greatest Players in NBA History and one of the 76 players named to the NBA 75th Anniversary Team in 2021. He was inducted into the Naismith Memorial Basketball Hall of Fame in 1973.

Schayes played his entire career with the Nationals and their successor, the Philadelphia 76ers, from 1948 to 1964.  In his 16-year career, he led his team into the playoffs  15 times. After the Nationals moved to Philadelphia, Schayes became player-coach of the newly minted 76ers. He retired after the 1963–64 season and stayed on as coach for two more seasons, earning NBA Coach of the Year honors in 1966. He briefly coached with the Buffalo Braves.

Early life
Schayes was born in the Bronx, New York, the son of Tina (née Michel), a homemaker, and Carl Schayes, a truck driver for Consolidated Laundries. His parents were Romanian-Jewish immigrants. He grew up on Davidson Avenue and 183rd Street, near Jerome Avenue in University Heights, Bronx.

Schayes attended Creston Junior High School 79 and DeWitt Clinton High School in the Bronx, New York, where he played for the basketball team and led it to a borough championship.

College career
He played his college basketball at New York University (NYU) in 1944–48.  In 1945, as a 16-year-old freshman, Schayes helped NYU reach the NCAA final.  Schayes earned an aeronautical engineering degree, was an All-American in basketball and won the Haggerty Award in his final year. His NYU coach, Howard Cann, said of him: "He was in the gym practicing every spare minute. We had to chase him out."

Professional career

Syracuse Nationals / Philadelphia 76ers (1949–1964)
Schayes was drafted by both the New York Knicks in the 1948 BAA draft (1st round; 4th pick overall), and by the Tri-Cities Blackhawks in the NBL draft. The Blackhawks traded his rights to the Syracuse Nationals, who then offered him a contract worth $7,500 (worth $ today), 50% more than the Knicks, influencing his decision to go to Syracuse. Schayes played one season in the NBL and was named the league's Rookie of the Year. The following season (1949–50), the Nationals moved to the newly formed National Basketball Association as part of the merger between the BAA and NBL.

Although tall for his era at 6' 7" (201 cm), Schayes was especially known for his deadly, high-arcing, outside set-shot. It arced so high that his teammates came to call it the "Sputnik".  Defenders who attempted to deny him the outside shot were confronted by his powerful drive to the basket. These two offensive weapons served him well, even as the NBA was transitioning from basketball's traditional set shot into a league of jump-shooters.

Early in Schayes' career, he broke his right arm and played almost an entire season in a cast. Oddly, this injury became a seminal point in his development: he learned to shoot with his off-hand, making him especially difficult to guard. He was one of the best—and the last—to use a two-handed set-shot with feet planted on the floor, before the game changed to one-handed jump shots.

In the 1949–50 season, he was 6th in the league in assists, with 259.  He led the NBA in rebounding in 1950–51 (in which he also had 10 of the top 14 individual rebounding games), with 1,080 and a 16.4-per-game average.  He was third in the league in rebounding in 1952–53, with 920.  In 1953–54, his 12.3 rebounds per game were fourth-best in the NBA.

In 1954–55, he led his team to the NBA championship.  In 1956–57, he led the league in minutes-per-game (39.6) and free throws (625), while grabbing 1,008 rebounds (3rd in the league) and averaging 22.6 points per game (4th in the league).  In 1957, he set an NBA consecutive free throw record in a single game with 18. In 1957–58 he again led the league in minutes-per-game (40.5), and averaged a career-high 24.9 points per game, second in the league, while averaging 14.2 rebounds per game (fourth in the NBA).

Schayes led the NBA in free throw percentage three times:  in 1958 (.904), 1960 (.892) and 1962 (.896).  In 1959, he scored a career-high 50 points in a game against the Celtics.  In the NBA, he didn't miss a single game from February 17, 1952, to December 26, 1961, an NBA-record streak of 706 games.  In 1960–61, he again led the league in free throws (with 680).  In 1961, he became the first player in NBA history to amass 30,000 career total PRA (Points + Rebounds + Assists).

NBA career achievements
Schayes was the first person in the NBA to ever surpass 15,000 points.

A 12-time NBA All-Star, Schayes was a six-time All-NBA First Team honoree, and was also selected to the All-NBA Second Team six times.  He came in second in MVP voting in 1958, and 5th in both 1956 and 1957.  When he retired in 1964, he held the NBA records for games played (996), foul shots made (6,712), attempted (7,904),  personal fouls (3,432) and was second to Bob Pettit in scoring (18,438) and third in rebounds (11,256).

NBA coach and referee supervisor
When the Nationals moved to Philadelphia in 1963 as the Philadelphia 76ers, Schayes became player-coach. However, his playing career had all but ended; he only played in 24 games, the only time in his career in which he played in fewer than 50 games. He didn't play at all during the playoffs.

He retired as a player after the season but stayed on as coach for three more seasons. He was named NBA Coach of the Year in 1966. That season, he led the Sixers to the Eastern Division regular-season title, ending a nine-year reign by the Boston Celtics. However, the Celtics ousted the Sixers in a five-game Eastern final, and Schayes was fired. He was succeeded by his predecessor with the Nats, Alex Hannum, who led the team to the best record in league history at the time and an NBA title.

From 1966 to 1970, he was the supervisor of NBA referees.  He was named the first coach of the Buffalo Braves in 1970, but was fired one game into his second season.

Maccabiah Games coach
Schayes coached the US Maccabiah Games basketball team to an upset win to take the gold medal in the 1977 Maccabiah Games.  He also coached the U.S. Masters basketball team at the 1993 Maccabiah Games. He also played an active role raising money for the Maccabiah Games.

Personal life
Schayes settled in Syracuse, New York, in 1948, where he first played in the NBA, and where he was a real estate developer after his playing days.

Schayes' son is retired NBA center Danny Schayes, who played for Jamesville-DeWitt High School, in DeWitt, New York; Syracuse University; and in the NBA for 18 seasons.  His granddaughters Abi, Carla, and Rachel Goettsch won silver medals for the United States volleyball team at the 2001 Maccabiah Games, and his grandson Mickey Ferri won a gold medal in the 4 × 100 metres relay at the 2005 Maccabiah Games.

Schayes died of cancer on December 10, 2015, at the age of 87. He was buried at Woodlawn Cemetery (Syracuse, NY), Section 30, Plot 475

Legacy
In 1970, Schayes was elected to the NBA 25th Anniversary Team as one of the top 12 retired players.

In 1972, he was elected to the Naismith Memorial Basketball Hall of Fame.  He is also a member of the International Jewish Sports Hall of Fame, the US National Jewish Sports Hall of Fame, and the National Jewish American Sports Hall of Fame.

In 1996, he was selected as one of the 50 Greatest Players in NBA History.

In May 2015, Schayes was inducted into the Bronx Walk of Fame, where he received a street named in his honor, called "Dolph Schayes Street".

The 76ers retired his jersey on March 12, 2016, while the Syracuse Crunch retired it on March 26, 2016.

In 2021, he was elected to the NBA 75th Anniversary Team. To commemorate the NBA's 75th Anniversary The Athletic ranked their top 75 players of all time, and named Schayes as the 61st greatest player in NBA history.

NBA career statistics

Regular season

Playoffs

See also

List of select Jewish basketball players
List of National Basketball Association annual minutes leaders
List of National Basketball Association career rebounding leaders
List of National Basketball Association career free throw scoring leaders
List of National Basketball Association career playoff free throw scoring leaders
List of NBA players who have spent their entire career with one franchise

References

Further reading

External links

 Dolph Schayes biography at NBA Encyclopedia
 Dolph Schayes grave at Woodlawn Cemetery (Syracuse, New York)

1928 births
2015 deaths
American men's basketball players
American people of Romanian-Jewish descent
Basketball coaches from New York (state)
Basketball players from New York City
Basketball players from Syracuse, New York
Buffalo Braves head coaches
Centers (basketball)
Deaths from cancer in New York (state)
DeWitt Clinton High School alumni
Jewish American sportspeople
Jewish men's basketball players
Naismith Memorial Basketball Hall of Fame inductees
National Basketball Association All-Stars
National Basketball Association players with retired numbers
National Collegiate Basketball Hall of Fame inductees
New York Knicks draft picks
NYU Violets men's basketball players
People from DeWitt, New York
Philadelphia 76ers head coaches
Philadelphia 76ers players
Player-coaches
Power forwards (basketball)
Sportspeople from the Bronx
Syracuse Nationals players
21st-century American Jews
Burials at Woodlawn Cemetery (Syracuse, New York)